are the giant robots and monsters of The Big O anime series. Forty years prior to the events of the series, the world was turned into a vast desert wasteland and the survivors were left without memories. The megadeuses are portrayed as remnants of the previous civilization, a lost technology few citizens of Paradigm know how to control. The word is a blend of the Greek Megas, meaning "Great", and the Latin deus, meaning "god".

The robots were designed by series creator Keiichi Sato, who also designed the Mazinger mechas featured on the Mazinkaiser OVA, the mutant creatures of The SoulTaker TV series, and was the director and creator of the Karas series.

The designs are strange and "more macho than practical." Unlike the giants of other robot anime, the megadeuses do not exhibit ninja-like speed nor grace or possess voice-activated special attacks; but for what they lack in agility, they more than make-up in firepower and protection. The robots come armed with weaponry like missiles, piston powered punches, machine guns, and laser cannons.

The nature of the megadeuses is tied to the event forty years prior. In the final episode of the first season, Roger Smith has a flashback in the form of a nightmare: an army of "Big" megadeuses burn down the city as a group of bald children look on. In the second season premiere, he experiences a lucid dream of a town without domes, where its citizens have not forgotten who they are and megadeuses are nowhere to be found. In the final episode, he gets another burst of memories: the city stands in ruins and multiple "Big" megadeuses fight amongst themselves while a winged giant oversees the onslaught.

In the tradition of Japanese monster movies, The Big O features monsters modeled after conventional or mythological creatures. The series follows the "villain of the week" formula, meaning the protagonist is hired to do a job and by episode's end he must battle a monster using a giant robot of his own. Given the series' style, for some critics the robot battles seem out of place, while others praise the "over-the-top-ness" of their execution.

The term "megadeus" is officially used to refer to all giant robots and monsters seen in the series, though the term is often used to refer solely to the four "Big" robots. The "Bigs" are unique among the other megadeuses in that they are implied to be at least semi-sentient and have the ability to judge a person's worthiness to be a pilot through the phrase "Cast in the Name of God," then a declaration of either "Ye Not Guilty" or "Ye Guilty."

Big O 
 is the eponymous megadeus of the series, piloted by Roger Smith. It is slow, lumbering, and heavy compared to more agile and lighter mecha featured in other series. However, it is at least capable of breaking into a run, and its movement speed is more or less directly related to the pilot's own reaction time. Big O's cockpit is located in its collar area. The actual pilot console is enclosed in a glass dome on a raised pedestal to protect the pilot from harsh environments, and Roger is able to see through the large orange window on Big O's neck. When entering or exiting the megadeus, either the entire collar portion rises up on hydraulic pistons or the large orange window can split in half and part like an automatic door.

Big O possesses a varied array of weapons. Unlike other mecha series, where the robot's weapons come from specifically designed equipment or spiritual energy, the creators of The Big O took an old-school approach. The cockpit includes an assortment of pedals, levers and buttons that control the giant and the weapons are hidden within the giant itself, so only by displacing certain parts of the megadeus' armor can the pilot make use of them.

It works by retracting the pressurized pistons inside the arms and subsequently releasing them. In "Roger the Negotiator", the combined strength of Big O's punch and the Sudden Impact explodes a hole in Dorothy-1's chest. In "Beck Comes Back", the released gust beheads the Beck Victory Deluxe; while in "Enemy Is Another Big!", it goes through three skyscrapers. The Sudden Impact can also be used to propel Big O through water as shown in "The Call From The Past".

The  is first used in Act:03. It is a concentrated energy beam fired from Big O's crown. The weapon is charged when Big O points its forearms upward and continues charging until Big O slams its fists together in front of it, at which point a beam fires continuously until the megadeus' hands separate. The beam can be sustained for a long time ("Day of The Advent") or fired in short continuous bursts ("Hydra"), though its output grows weaker the longer it is sustained. The material that makes up Big O's crown and cockpit canopy can deflect beams ("Beck Comes Back") but it can also crack under pressure ("Enemy is Another Big!") and even be destroyed ("The Show Must Go On").

Hidden in the megadeus' abdominal area are 18 missiles, used for an attack known as  first seen in "Underground Terror". During the second season opener, it is revealed the waist is actually made up by two rows of eight anchors each. The anchors may be guided from the cockpit, as seen in "Twisted Memories" and it appears as though there are multiple anchors and chains in each launcher. This is seen on several occasions when Big O has fired off an anchor, detached the chain, and another anchor appears in its place on Big O's hip. Other features include arm shields, a radar, a communication device and a station to keep the Griffon located in either foot. ("Stripes").

Big O's original design included interchangeable weapons for the robot's arms. While this feature is not displayed in the TV series, it was implemented in the manga incarnation. Some of the weapons featured in the manga are an electric attack arm, drill arm, a rocket-propelled mace and an upgraded Sudden Impact.

New weapons were designed for the show's second season. Once activated, the armor covering the forearm opens exposing four gun barrels. The rotating barrels fire energy volleys at high-speed, while generating a ring of energy that explodes on impact. The  is used for the first time during the "Hydra" battle. The armor on Big O's shoulders and forearms opens, revealing electric shield projectors. These then project a spherical shield of plasma which surrounds Big O and protects him from any incoming attack. If the foot button used to activate the Plasma Gimmick is pressed again, the shield can be used as a weapon. Big O raises his forearm projectors and the plasma shield increases in area, destroying anything surrounding the Megadeus. The  is used during the final episode. Big O's 'steam boiler' chest-plate opens up and a massive, telescopic cannon emerges from the Megadeus' chest. The Mobydick Anchors are deployed into the ground to withstand the recoil, the Plasma Gimmick is activated to protect the momentarily incapacitated Megadeus and the Sudden Impact pistons  are primed to give a little extra firepower to the projectile itself. The cannon has enough destructive force to destroy an entire dome in one shot and is so powerful that it erodes itself to rust & breaks off after use, leaving a cavity in Big O's chest.

At times, Big O appears to have a mind of its own. When Roger is in danger of threatened with death during the last episode of the first season, the megadeus goes to its master and stops the assassin. Roger is in the habit of talking to it, even though Big O is never heard talking back. During the fight with Bonaparte in "The Third Big", Big O locks itself and lets Roger out because R. Dorothy is in danger. In "Enemy Is Another Big!", Schwarzwald suggests that Big O may have chosen Roger, not the other way around; while the killer android R.D. implies those who pilot a megadeus respond to a higher power and have a great mission to accomplish. In the middle of a hallucination during "Roger the Wanderer", The Negotiator remembers how Big O was waiting for him. Big O, like other Big-type megadeuses, is able to fuse with its pilot via a series of prehensile cables designed to attach to the pilot's spine. It attempts this process in the final episode, but Roger convinces it otherwise.

Big O's design was the creators' way of creating something distinguishable from the Gundam franchise and the Real Robot series inspired by it. Instead of blocky body parts, Sato designed a mecha where the chest and hips were not separate from the rest of the body. That way, the giant's movement would seem sluggish, comparable to the giants of old tokusatsu shows, portrayed by actors in bulky, heavy costumes. According to designer Sato, the name "Big O" comes from the opening theme of Daitetsujin 17, "Oh! Giant Ironman". Big O's summoning is an homage to Mitsuteru Yokoyama's Giant Robo. By calling the megadeus' name into his wristwatch, Roger calls Big O and it travels to Roger's location by way of underground railways. When Roger informs the giant it is "Showtime!" and it plows up to its master's side. The boot sequence ("Cast in the name of God, Ye not guilty") is a design of series director Katayama, who first learned of the phrase through a magazine article on John Milius and the Conan the Barbarian series. According to the article, the phrase comes from the swords of executioners in the 17th century. A variation of the phrase ("Suffer no guilt ye who wields this in the name of Crom") is engraved in Conan's sword. Katayama liked the sound of it and decided to use it as the robot's call to arms. The phrase is generally seen as the megadeus judging the pilot's worthiness to sit in the cockpit. Roger also tends to shout the phrase "Big O! In... Action!" before marching into battle, furthering the series' prevalent theater and film themes.

First season

Dorothy-1 
 is the first megadeus that Big O does battle with in Act:01 and Act:02. It was built by Soldano, the creator of the android R. Dorothy Wayneright. R. Dorothy and Dorothy-1 are considered sisters to each other by Soldano, who soon dies after warning Roger about Beck's hijacking of the Dorothy units. Dorothy-1 is initially used by Beck to rob a bank of its mint plates, but is quickly destroyed by The Big O. R. Dorothy and Dorothy-1 are apparently intertwined technologically, as Beck proves capable of resurrecting Dorothy-1 by implanting R. Dorothy into the control unit of her sister unit. Throughout the episode, R. Dorothy displays a subtle synchronization with Dorothy-1 in the form of mimicking movement and sound.

Dorothy-1 is equipped with a pair of claws on each arm from which long metallic tentacles and power drills extend. These tools suggest that Dorothy-1 was built as a fairly benign robot, designed to save people trapped by rubble or prison cells. This is further proven in its overall lack of fighting capability. The Dorothy units, while seemingly trivial in the scope of the series, are some few objects constructed according to memories prior to The Event; the existence of such memories strongly implies that the megadeuses and other large robots were mass-produced using contemporary Paradigm City technology. The interactions between R. Dorothy and Dorothy-1 also help to illustrate the nature of megadeus-android relationships and suggest an even closer technological bond between megadeus-type units and androids, especially R. Dorothy. Beck's intricate knowledge of this relationship implies extensive previous experience with megadeuses prior to The Event on his part.  Dorothy 1 bears a resemblance to one of Ultraman's monsters, Baltan.

Eel 
A giant electric eel located near Electric City, the product of genetic research by a resident scientist. The , believed to be a deity of the lake, fed on electrical energy and was in a slumber under the lake until Angel reactivated the dam's turbine systems and reawakened the creature. The "Water God" could fire an electric shock from its mouth and use the electrical energy within itself to generate a force field between its jaws. It was blasted to bits by Big O's Chromebuster. The monster's remains were later gathered by the Paradigm Science group for what would eventually become the Hydra Eel.

Archetype 
The  is a prototype Big-type megadeus introduced in the "Act 04: Underground Terror", buried amidst the ruins of a technological expo far beneath Paradigm.  The unmanned robot lacks the armor and faceplate worn by other Big-type megadeuses and appears to be in complete ruin, though the lack of armor allows it to move with much greater speed and agility.  Upon contact with the android R. Dorothy Wayneright, the Archetype is revealed to be functional and aggressively seeks to either capture or crush both R. Dorothy and Roger Smith.

The Archetype makes a brief appearance in Roger's dream in Act:14, as a character in a comic strip. In Act:17, it is revealed the Paradigm Corporation salvaged the megadeus as part of their effort to reconstruct the Big Duo Inferno.

Osrail 
, who makes its appearance in Act:05, is a mysterious megadeus hidden beneath the sea, which activated to rescue a fallen police officer. It was capable of generating a fog which it used to project the image of a holographic non-corporeal monster; allowing it to attack its opponent with homing energy blasts. It was defeated when Big O's radar revealed its true location to Roger and he used the Arc Line to destroy it.

Constanze 
Featured in Act:06.  is piloted by the android R. Instro, after realizing that his late father's supposed legacy was a weapon made to destroy the city. Constanze produces sound waves capable of cracking Big O's armor and acting as a shield. It was defeated with the help of Dorothy's piano playing, which distracted Instro long enough for Roger to destroy its arms with a missile barrage. Instro's highly advanced, one-of-a-kind hands are permanently plugged into Constanze's controls once he inserts them, forcing him to destroy them to disconnect himself from the machine.

Dagon 
The megadeus featured in "Act 07: The Call from The Past", is named after , a Phoenician agricultural deity often depicted as a sea creature. In the episode, the local fishermen stopped fishing out of fear of it.  Without a pilot to control it, the titan goes on a rampage above water before it is defeated by Roger and the Big O. Its only displayed weaponry were two sets of missile batteries, one on each shoulder.

Dagon's servants are the "frog-men" who scared the fishermen into not going out to sea. They are actually a Paradigm investigation team wearing scuba-gear, hired to search for Memories in the South Sea. Their design is inspired by the Deep Ones, the frog-men worshippers of Dagon in Lovecraft's The Shadow Over Innsmouth novella.

Chimera 
Featured "Act 08: Missing Cat". It is revealed that in Paradigm City, a cat or dog is worth a lot of money, since most animals were wiped out during or shortly after The Event that occurred forty years ago. A man named Eugene had been conducting experiments to bring back these types of animals using genetic research, funded by Paradigm until he back-stabbed them and started creating mutated versions. One of his creations was Pierrot, a kitten which used to be a human boy named Roy Ferry. Pierrot found itself in the possession of R. Dorothy until Eugene kidnapped her to retrieve him and murdered Pierrot's owners, who were his real parents.

Beck Victory Deluxe 
Its inferiority to the Big O is highlighted when it attempts to rise from underground, similar to the Big O, but gets stuck halfway. Beck Victory Deluxe fired missiles from its chest as well as laser beams from its finger tips. Nevertheless, it was no match for Big O who decapitated it with a Sudden Impact blast.

Eumenides 
It is a large-scale model of the toy-robot bombs used throughout the episode. Eumenides is the first megadeus of foreign origin to attack Paradigm City. Built as a suicide model, Eumenides was packed with explosives, forcing Big O to fling it out of the city before safely detonating it with the Arc Line.

Daemonseed 
Featured in Act:11, on Heaven's Day Eve, the  grew into a massive Christmas tree that threatened to destroy the domes but Roger and Big O fought it off until it stopped growing.

Big Duo 
 is the second Big found in the series, piloted first by Schwarzwald. Schwarzwald planned to use the megadeus to destroy Paradigm, using its flight capability to attack the domes, or "false skies" as he calls them.

It was found by the former reporter in an abandoned hangar in the desert to the south of Paradigm City, as revealed in a flashback in Act:17. When it first appears, the entire megadeus is wrapped in bandages, hiding its true nature until Schwarzwald reveals himself. Roger is able to defeat Big Duo by grounding it and crushing its head, taking out one of its arms in the process. However, Big Duo still moves without a head or a pilot, and as a final act it reaches towards Paradigm City's center before shutting down. It is possible that the semi-sentient megadeus reaches for Paradigm HQ with the intentions of trying to carry out the wishes of Schwarzwald regardless of its defeat and crippling damage. R. Dorothy later investigated the nearby area and found traces of Angel's presence. Big Duo is the only megadeus possessing the ability of flight, with the possible exception of Big Venus.  Its propeller hands could also serve as a cutting weapon.  Additional armaments included machine guns in its forearms, missile batteries in its chest, a pair of high ordnance missiles stored in its knees and the Arc Line, a beam weapon found in the eyes of all three Bigs. Big Duo was also capable of producing a smoke screen. Due to its great speed and heft, it was effective at using its entire body as a battering weapon. It is diving punch was equivalent to a Sudden Impact punch from Big O, and therefore the two attacks can cancel each other out.

Alex Rosewater later salvages the wreckage of Big Duo, seen in Act:13. Using the salvaged remains of the Archetype, Rosewater is able to modify Big Duo into , now with a new head and arms with sharp red and white claws that enable it to drill, as well as a flame paint job on its arms. The repeating missile launchers in its chest were removed for reasons unknown (leaving clean holes straight through the chest), and its Arc Line was converted from the typical twin beams to a single emitter in its larger left eye. Rosewater gives the megadeus to cyborg Alan Gabriel as payment for his services, with the cyborg hard-wired directly to the controls. Alan uses the Big Duo Inferno on Roger, who realized the megadeus was the same Big Duo he previously fought, when commenting "However, that isn't the megadeus's original form". After Roger uses the O Thunder attack to decapitate the megadeus, Alan manages to surprise and almost kill Roger. However, Big Duo Inferno suddenly attacks Alan with wires after displaying the message "Ye Guilty", implying Alan was not worthy to pilot the megadeus. Big Duo Inferno then launches itself into the air, slowly rising higher over the course of the final three episodes. Alan is seemingly killed by Big Duo's wiring before being ejected out. Schwarzwald's image appeared and his thoughts were heard by Alan as Big Duo rejected the mummified cyborg. Big Duo Inferno finally explodes when it collides with what appears to be a gigantic stage light, miles above Paradigm City.

Second season

Foreign Megadeuses 
Introduced at the end of Act:13 and combatted in Act:14, the foreign megadeuses come from beyond the sea of Paradigm to attack the city. , the largest of the three, has a squarish body that contains a sonic-based weapon similar to that of Constanze.  bears drills upon its arms.  has an electrical attack generated from its hands and horn, which can arc to Carnot's hands and Robespierre's horn. They are revealed to be vessels designed to deliver the components of Big Fau to Alex Rosewater. The discarded parts are reassembled to form Bonaparte.

Glinda 
Featured in Act:15,  is a feminine robot constructed by Dr. Wayneright at his private estate as a security measure. Activated only once during an investigation of Wayneright's manor laboratory, it was easily destroyed by The Big O. It possessed a green laser that overheated metal, causing a whole line of tanks to explode. In addition, it possessed an extraordinary amount of agility despite the fact that it was actually slightly larger than Big O itself. It is the only megadeus in the series that appears to be capable of jumping and performing other related acrobatics (Partially due to the fact it has built in pistons in its feet). Its hands could be used as stabbing weapons as seen in its repeated knife-handing of Big O's arm shields. Its most formidable weapon was an extendable sword that it kept tucked away on a compartment on its left thigh. This sword has the distinction of being the only weapon in the series that was able to damage Big O's arm shields (a slash from the sword was seen to slightly cut into the shields). Unfortunately for Glinda, it was also a very fragile weapon, and it was destroyed by a punch from Big O when Glinda attempted to use a stabbing technique. The megadeus was then itself destroyed by O Thunder.

Like Dorothy, Glinda shares its name with a character from The Wonderful Wizard of Oz, a work Chiaki Konaka occasionally references in his scripts.

Leviathan 
Featured in Act:17, and most likely activated by Schwarzwald, the  four claws can be energized and turn anything that it touches into sand. It appeared to have been called into the city by R. Dorothy when she accidentally began to speak in the same rapid and indiscernible manner as when she confronted the Archetype. Its purpose did not appear to be overtly destructive; its goal seemed only to be to incorporate R. Dorothy into itself. It was defeated when Big O turned its own energized claws against itself.

The megadeus is named after the biblical sea monster Leviathan, and thus a counterpart to the Behemoth.

Beck the Great RX3 
 is featured in Act:18, "The Greatest Villain." Commissioned by Beck, with the purpose of finally humiliating Roger and Big O, and constructed by Yoshifura-Yakamoto Industries, in a ploy for lucrative contracts with the Paradigm Corporation.

The megadeus is a pastiche of combining mecha found in other Japanese media, such as the "Super Sentai" and "Super Robot" series, with an overdone samurai motif covered in kanji. Piloted by Beck and his two henchmen, Dove and T-Bone, three vehicles combine into the giant robot. The  sequence is started by the command: "Implement Final Formation!" ( in Japanese.) T-Bone's trailer transforms into RX3's lower body. the blue vehicle performs a bootleg turn to form the legs and waist. Dove's construction vehicle makes up the upper body, pulling itself up onto the blue lower half. The torso sprouts hands from a drill and a pincer, much like Getter Robo's Getter-2 form. Beck's sports car jumps off a nearby ramp and dives into a recess in the head to form the cockpit, in a homage to Mazinger Z, completing the sequence. After this display of bravado, much bragging, and overly-dramatic poses, Roger (having had an inordinately irritating day up to this point) and Big O destroyed the RX3 in a single blast of O Thunder, ending the fight before it could actually start. The only weapon the RX3 appeared to have was a boomerang-shaped bladed weapon, made by combining the two halves of it stored on the shoulders. When combined, the kanji for "cut" appears on the center of the weapon.

Construction Robot 
Featured in Act:19. A robot taken over by the Union for use in obtaining memories from advanced androids such as R. Dorothy. Its weaponry included only construction tools such as a digging claw, a chainsaw, a drill, and a large nail gun. It is disabled by Big O with a single punch, as it was never really designed with combat in mind. Its eye bears a resemblance to the "mono-eye" used by Zaku II's and other Zeon mobile suits from the Gundam franchise.

Bonaparte 
 is built from the remains of the three foreign megadeuses after Big Fau's parts were extracted from them. These parts consist of (from lower to upper) Fouche's legs, Robespierre's drills, Carnot's arms, Robespierre's hip section and both Robespierre & Fouche's heads. It began its rampage through the main dome in Act:20, while Big O attempted to stop it, only for Roger to abandon Big O to save R. Dorothy. Its weaponry was, while limited, remarkably destructive. Said weapons included a pair of large drills, extendable heads and a purple, electricity-like energy attack, but the energy attack was powerful enough to destroy a very large portion of the superstructure of Paradigm's main dome. It was destroyed by Alex Rosewater and Big Fau in Act:21. Its design is a homage to "Doublas M2", one of the first "mechanical brutes" from Mazinger Z.

Hydra Eel 
The , which appears in Act:22, is an advanced triple-headed version of the Eel from Act:03. When the Eel's remains were recovered by the Paradigm Science Group, they used their genetic engineering to create a mutated albino clone. The Hydra was used by Paradigm's systems until Vera detonated the creature's holding cell, letting it loose on the city. Like its genetic template, the creature attacked with extremely large electrical blasts; this included a supersized blast that combined the energy of all three heads into a single charged blast. It also had a remarkable regenerative ability, as seen when it was able to fully regrow two of its three heads in a matter of seconds. The research team's original intention was to use the Hydra's bio-electricity to reactivate Big Fau, which they achieved by extending a lightning rod and siphoning off the Hydra's electricity as its attack bounced off Big O's recently rediscovered Plasma Gimmick. Roger Smith and Big O destroyed the Hydra Eel by expanding the energy shield towards the Hydra, completely dissolving it.

Big Fau 
First appearing in Roger's memories of "The Event" in Act:13, and first seen in action during Act:21, aptly titled "The Third Big",  is the third in the series which had a certain importance and was piloted by Alex Rosewater. Considered by Alex to be the most powerful "Big." The parts for Big Fau were transported within the three foreign megadeuses that fought Big O offshore of Paradigm City at the end of the first season and the beginning of the second season. After the foreign megadeuses were disabled (but not destroyed), they were recovered by the Paradigm science team and Big Fau's parts were salvaged and re-assembled secretly under the supervision of Alex. The megadeus, however, lacked a Memory Core. Ultimately, this vital component of unspecified purpose was disregarded initially by Alex, and Big Fau was activated and piloted by Rosewater.

Big Fau's primary weapons were the turbines mounted just below its hands known as "Saw Cuffs".  When activated, they could grind through practically any material or even allow Big Fau to drill its fist straight through an opponent's body. The fists themselves could also spin, giving the megadeus' punches an incredible amount of destructive power.  Additional weapons included two heavy beam cannons mounted in its shoulders, the standard Arc Line laser eyes which all Big type megadeuses have and laser projectors that extended on flexible periscope-like extensions from its back. Big Fau was also able to fire its arms at an opponent, the turbines drilling through any obstacle before detonating.  Big Fau is equipped with some kind of energy shield which can repel Big O's fists and other matter-based attacks (missiles, bullets etc.). Judging by Big Fau's streamlined appearance, its turbine wrists, its ability to travel effortlessly through the water shown in the final episode, its conning tower shaped head as well as a conning tower on its back, and the flexible periscope-like laser cannons on its back, it is likely that Big Fau units were used primarily for naval combat, functioning as heavily armed amphibious craft, and providing ocean-based combat support for land- and air-based megadeuses.

During its maiden battle against the Union Megadeus Bonaparte, Alex could completely control the Big, allowing him to tear Bonaparte to pieces before finally destroying it with Fau's dorsal beams. Once Bonaparte was vanquished, however, Big Fau's laser projectors disobeyed Alex's orders and began to assault the domes. In response to Alex's claim that he was Big Fau's dominus, Big Fau displayed the message "Cast in the Name of God... Ye Not-" before shutting down. Later, Big Fau was jury-rigged into working by Jason Beck using R. Dorothy's Memory Core, finally completing Fau and allowing it to declare Rosewater "Not Guilty."  Fau is also the only known Megadeus to fuse with its pilot, Rosewater, via a series of cables plugged into its pilot's back, although Big O attempted to do the same with Roger, and Big Duo wrapped, and subsequently mummified, Alan Gabriel before rejecting him with the message "Ye Guilty". Big Fau was eventually disabled by Big O's Final Stage and removed by Big Venus. Big Fau may be a reference to Frankenstein's Monster because of its long head and bolt-like ears, as well as the nature of its reconstruction.

Behemoth 
The , named after the creature mentioned in the Book of Job, appears at the end of the penultimate episode. It is many times larger than any other megadeus that had been see before, and bears large drills on its shoulders and a quadruped design. The Behemoth is activated by Vera Ronstadt, the leader of the Union, and is only seen for a brief time. As Big O lifts it into the air it is crushed under the weight of debris falling from above the city.

Big Venus 
 appears briefly in Act:26 after Angel realizes her role in Paradigm City and transforms into the megadeus. Venus' design is almost identical to Big O, except for a redesigned, albeit similar, face featuring a rictus grin, and a pair of wings it is shown to have in a flashback to the Event. It appears in the present day with inverted colors and its wings are removed. Big Venus apparently has the power to alter people's memories and even reality itself and is responsible for erasing the memories of all of Paradigm's citizens forty years ago. It would have done so again but Roger confronts Big Venus this time (as Gordon Rosewater had intended), which begins erasing everything simply by walking past it until only the two Bigs remain. Roger uses his skills as the Negotiator to convince Angel to let people keep their memories (which represent self-awareness), as Big Venus slowly approaches. Big O and Big Venus then walk into and pass through one another, and Roger is able to confront Angel as the Director. Big Venus may be a command version of Big O's model, as it is seen overseeing the Big-type megadeus rampage in flashbacks of The Event.

The name "Venus" alludes to the "morning star" and the fallen angel of Christian mythology, Lucifer. "Venus" also refers to the Roman name for Aphrodite the most feminine and beautiful of the ancient Greek Goddesses.

Manga series

Charybdis 
 looks like a ghost ship.

Dantalion 
 hibernated underground until unearthed by a scientist looking for memories.

Gigadeus 
When he traveled underground, Beck was flooded with a vast wealth of memories hidden down there. Beck came to believe Big O allowed Roger to enter the underground unfazed by the vast amount of memories. Even after returning to the surface, Beck began to repeatedly return to the underground to experience the memories. As a consequence, Beck began to succumb to the memories and his henchmen soon noticed Beck's new lackluster attitude towards the massive spending he was doing, especially when Beck nonchalantly bought his own dome. While Roger was fighting his henchmen, Beck used the Gigadeus to break the ground beneath Big O and pull it down to the underground expo where Schwarzwald found the megadeus Archetype.

The Gigadeus is a three-headed, three-legged robot which greatly resembles the other Big robots. Whether it had a 'Big' name like Big O is unknown. Beck coined the term while comparing his much bigger and stronger robot, a Gigadeus, to the smaller, seemingly weaker Big O, a megadeus. The Gigadeus is massive, even by megadeus standards, being three times larger than Big O. Not only is the Gigadeus huge, but it is also heavily armored, being able to take a punch from Big O without even being fazed. Not only is the Gigadeus heavily armored, it is also quite well armed. Each of the three heads is different, the right head has a short dragon mouth and can breathe fire, the center head can fire lasers from its main eyes and four other holes above its eyes, while the left head has a visor over its eyes and has no identifiable power. Each of its three heads can extend its neck out from its body with tentacle-like necks which can wrap around things. Attached to each elbow is a massive drill, with spikes at its base, which can be brought to bear by rotating the hands to face backwards. The Gigadeus can also use its middle leg to send Big O flying with a single powerful kick. During the battle Roger began having hallucinations of objects from history, objects, animals, and even people, which turned out to be memories which the Gigadeus was showing Beck. Beck questioned Roger whether Big O had shown Roger similar memories. Beck also expressed a new all-consuming greed to keep these memories all to himself by eliminating Roger. The Gigadeus is ultimately destroyed when Roger fires Big O's Chrome Buster into its chest, which kills Beck in the process. Beck's soulless, hollow eyes and hysterical smile haunts Roger after the battle.

Giga is Greek for Giant Therefore, the direct translation of Gigadeus is "Giant God".

References 

The Big O
Fictional mecha